The 1953 Dixie Classic was a mid-season college basketball tournament held December 28–30, 1953 at NC State's Reynolds Coliseum in Raleigh, North Carolina. It was the fifth iteration of the Dixie Classic and it was part of the 1953–54 NCAA men's basketball season. The Duke Blue Devils won the final, defeating the Navy Midshipmen 98–83.

Coming into the tournament, 9th-ranked host NC State, who had won the first four Dixie Classics, and 12th-ranked Oregon State were favorites to win the tournament. However, the final was contested by Duke and Navy. Duke won 98–83, breaking Navy's six-game unbeaten streak.

Teams
Each year, the Dixie Classic included the "Big Four" teams (Duke, NC State, North Carolina, and Wake Forest), as well as four other invited teams. The 1953 teams were:
 Navy Midshipmen
 North Carolina Tar Heels
 Seton Hall Pirates
 NC State Wolfpack
 Oregon State Beavers
 Duke Blue Devils
 Tulane Green Wave
 Wake Forest Demon Deacons

Bracket

Game log

References

External links
 
 1953 Dixie Classic program via NC State Libraries

1953–54 NCAA men's basketball season
1953 in sports in North Carolina
December 1953 sports events in the United States
1953